George Ross Cowmeadow (born 3 November 2003) is an English professional footballer who plays as a forward for Swindon Supermarine on loan from League Two club Swindon Town.

Club career
Prior to his move to Swindon Town in 2014, Cowmeadow played for Procision Football Academy up to under-11 level. After participating during the club's 2021–22 pre-season, he went on to make his debut for the club in their EFL Trophy group-stage tie against Plymouth Argyle on 12 October 2021, replacing Rob Hunt in the 63rd minute as The Robins secured a 3–1 victory.

On 16 September 2022, Cowmeadow joined National League South club Slough Town on a one-month loan deal and later made his debut as a substitute in the 2-0 loss against Hemel Hempstead and later, on 10 November 2022, he joined Southern League Division One Central side Kidlington on loan until the end of January 2023. In February 2023, he joined Poole Town on a one-month loan deal. In March 2023, he joined Swindon Supermarine on loan until the end of the season.

International career
In February 2020, Cowmeadow received a maiden call-up to a Wales U17 preparation camp.

Career statistics

References

External links

2003 births
Living people
Welsh footballers
Association football forwards
Swindon Town F.C. players
Slough Town F.C. players
Kidlington F.C. players
Poole Town F.C. players
Swindon Supermarine F.C. players
English Football League players
National League (English football) players
Southern Football League players